Tropical Storm Ignacio was a strong tropical storm that deluged the Mexican coast with heavy rains. The 9th named storm and 11th tropical cyclone of the 1991 Pacific hurricane season, the system formed from two tropical waves. The pair moved across the Atlantic during the first ten days of September. The second of the two spawned Tropical Storm Erika in the eastern Atlantic. Emerging into the eastern Pacific between the September 10 and September 12, an area of thunderstorms developed southeast of an upper level cyclone off the southern tip of Baja California Sur due to the interaction of the upper cyclone with the pair of tropical waves. By the September 15, the thunderstorm activity organized into bands, indicating the presence of a new tropical depression, the eleventh of the season. The cyclone moved north-northwest due to steering around the upper cyclone, and became a tropical storm by noon on the September 16. Once the upper cyclone moved away from Ignacio, its motion towards the Mexican coast stopped on September 17, and it executed a slow anticyclonic loop that would be completed late on the September 18. Proximity to land and west to southwesterly vertical wind shear weakened the cyclone, and Ignacio regained tropical depression status late on the September 18. The system dissipated as a tropical cyclone that night, and its remnants moved west-southwest into the tropical Pacific, occasionally flaring up new convection over the succeeding couple days.

Meteorological history

The origins of Ignacio formed from two tropical waves. The pair moved across the Atlantic during the first ten days of September. The second of the two spawned Tropical Storm Erika in the eastern Atlantic. It emerged into the eastern Pacific between the September 10 and September 12. An area of thunderstorms developed southeast of an upper level cyclone off the southern tip of Baja California Sur due to the interaction of the upper cyclone with the pair of tropical waves. The storm continued to intensify and became a tropical storm later in the day. The tropical cyclone's forward motion was slow, along with a small clockwise loop, a track that was somewhat unexpected.

Once the upper cyclone moved away from Ignacio, its motion towards the Mexican coast stopped on September 17, and it executed a slow anticyclonic loop that would be completed late on the September 18. Tropical storm warnings were issued for the affected portion of southwest Mexico. The few surface-observing sites reported many hours of rain, some locally heavy, from noon on September 16 to early on September 18. Several ships reported tropical storm-force winds. The OMI Willamette reported the highest surface winds of the event.

Ignacio weakened quickly on September 18, probably due to the combined effects of the storm's close proximity to land and persistence of waters likely cooled by upwelling. Strong winds aloft, shearing Ignacio from the southwest, might have contributed to the weakening as well. Ignacio was downgraded to a tropical depression on September 19 and became a remnant low later that day. The remnants of Ignacio, identified on satellite imagery as occasional flare-ups of convection, moved west-southwestwards over the next two days.

Preparations and impact

When Ignacio was closely approaching the coast of Mexico, a tropical storm warning was issued from Zihuatenajo to Cuyutan on September 16. When Ignacio was forecast to move up the coast, the warnings were extended to Cabo Corrientes, Jalisco on September 17. However, the warnings were dropped when the cyclone dissipated.

Despite remaining offshore, the outer rainbands of Tropical Storm Ignacio widespread rain to Mexico. The storm also caused street flooding in Acapulco. Ten people died in Guerrero due to flash flooding. In addition, heavy rains and high ways brought widespread damage to nine other Mexican states. The remnants of the storm caused several dams to burst in the state of Chihuahua, leaving 10,000 people homeless and killing another 13. In all, 40 people were injured.

See also

Tropical Storm Julio (2002)

References

Ignacio 1991
Ignacio 1991
1991 in Mexico
Ignacio